Smilax aspera, with common names common smilax, rough bindweed, sarsaparille, and Mediterranean smilax, is a species of flowering vine in the greenbriar family.

Description
Smilax aspera is a  perennial, evergreen climber with a flexible and delicate stem, with sharp thorns. It is the monocot with reticulate type of venation. Also the midrib of the underside of the leaves are provided with spines. The flowers, very fragrant, are small, yellowish or greenish, gathered in axillary racemes. The flowering period in Mediterranean regions extends from September to November. The fruits are globose berries, gathered in clusters, which ripen in Autumn. They are initially red, later turn black. They're insipid and unpalatable to humans, but they are a source of nourishment for many species of birds.

Distribution
It is widespread in  Central Africa (Democratic Republic of Congo, Kenya, Ethiopia), Mediterranean Europe (Cyprus, Albania, Croatia, Greece, Italy, Malta, Montenegro, France, Portugal, Spain), temperate Asia ( Israel, Jordan, Lebanon, Syria, Turkey) and tropical Asia  (India, Bhutan, Nepal). It is also naturalized in other regions.

Habitat

Gallery

See also
Smilax glyciphylla (sweet sarsaparille)

References

External links
 Biolib

Smilacaceae
Flora of Europe
Flora of Asia
Flora of Africa
Plants described in 1753
Taxa named by Carl Linnaeus